Karen O'Rourke is an artist and Emeritus Professor at Jean Monnet University in Saint-Etienne. Her personal work tends to relate artistic practice with the notion of network with that of archiving and with that of territory. She has published numerous articles in journals (Leonardo, Delivery, Aperture, La revue du Cube, AI & Society, Figures de l'art, Plastik, etc.) and collective works (Art-Réseaux, Territoires, Art++). She is the author of two synthesis books; Walking and Mapping: Artists as Cartographers (MIT Press, 2013) and From the arts-networks to programmed drifts: current events in “art as experience”.

See also 
 Fax art

References 

Living people
Academic staff of Jean Monnet University
Year of birth missing (living people)